Edith Nesbit (married name Edith Bland; 15 August 1858 – 4 May 1924) was an English writer and poet, who published her books for children as E. Nesbit. She wrote or collaborated on more than 60 such books. She was also a political activist and co-founder of the Fabian Society, a socialist organisation later affiliated to the Labour Party.

Biography
Nesbit was born in 1858 at 38 Lower Kennington Lane, Kennington, Surrey (now classified as Inner London), the daughter of an agricultural chemist, John Collis Nesbit, who died in March 1862, before her fourth birthday. Her mother was Sarah Green (née Alderton).

The ill health of Edith's sister Mary meant that the family travelled for some years, living variously in Brighton, Buckinghamshire, France (Dieppe, Rouen, Paris, Tours, Poitiers, Angoulême, Bordeaux, Arcachon, Pau, Bagnères-de-Bigorre, and Dinan in Brittany), Spain and Germany. Mary was engaged in 1871 to the poet Philip Bourke Marston, but later that year she died of tuberculosis in Normandy.

After Mary's death, Edith and her mother settled for three years at Halstead Hall, Halstead, north-west Kent, a location that inspired The Railway Children, although the distinction has also been claimed by the Derbyshire town of New Mills.

When Nesbit was 17, the family moved back to Lewisham in south-east London. There is a Lewisham Council plaque to her at 28 Elswick Road.

In 1877, at the age of 18, Nesbit met the bank clerk Hubert Bland, her elder by three years. Seven months pregnant, she married Bland on 22 April 1880, but did not initially live with him, as Bland remained with his mother. Their marriage was tumultuous. Early on, Nesbit found that another woman believed she was Hubert's fiancée and had also borne him a child. A more serious blow came in 1886, when she discovered that her friend, Alice Hoatson, was pregnant by him. She had previously agreed to adopt Hoatson's child and allow Hoatson to live with her as their housekeeper. After she discovered the truth, she and her husband quarrelled violently and she suggested that Hoatson and the baby, Rosamund, should leave; her husband threatened to leave Edith if she disowned the baby and its mother. Hoatson remained with them as a housekeeper and secretary and became pregnant by Bland again 13 years later. Edith again adopted Hoatson's child, John.

Nesbit's children by Bland were Paul Cyril Bland (1880–1940), to whom The Railway Children was dedicated, Mary Iris Bland (1881–1965), who married John Austin D Phillips in 1907, and Fabian Bland (1885–1900). Bland's two children by Alice Hoatson, whom Edith adopted, were Rosamund Edith Nesbit Hamilton, later Bland (1886–1950), who married Clifford Dyer Sharp on 16 October 1909, and to whom The Book of Dragons was dedicated, and John Oliver Wentworth Bland (1899–1946) to whom The House of Arden and Five Children and It were dedicated. Nesbit's son Fabian died aged 15 after a tonsil operation; Nesbit dedicated several books to him, including The Story of the Treasure Seekers and its sequels. Nesbit's adopted daughter Rosamund collaborated with her on Cat Tales.

Nesbit admired the artist and Marxian socialist William Morris. The couple joined the founders of the Fabian Society in 1884, after which their son Fabian was named, and jointly edited its journal Today. Hoatson was its assistant secretary. Nesbit and Bland dallied with the Social Democratic Federation, but found it too radical. Nesbit was a prolific lecturer and writer on socialism in the 1880s. She and her husband co-wrote under the pseudonym "Fabian Bland", However, the joint work dwindled as her success rose as a children's author. She was a guest speaker at the London School of Economics, which had been founded by other Fabian Society members.

Edith lived from 1899 to 1920 at Well Hall, Eltham, in south-east London, which makes fictional appearances in several of her books, such as The Red House. From 1911 she kept a second home on the Sussex Downs at Crowlink, Friston, East Sussex. She and her husband entertained many friends, colleagues and admirers at Well Hall.

On 20 February 1917, some three years after Bland died, Nesbit married Thomas "the Skipper" Tucker in Woolwich, where he was captain of the Woolwich Ferry.

Towards the end of her life, Nesbit moved first to Crowlink, then to "The Long Boat" at Jesson, St Mary's Bay, New Romney, Kent, where probably suffering from lung cancer (she "smoked incessantly"), she died in 1924 and was buried in the churchyard of St Mary in the Marsh. Her husband Thomas died at the same address on 17 May 1935. Edith's son Paul Bland was an executor of Thomas Tucker's will.

Writer
Nesbit's first published works were poems. She was under 20 in March 1878, when the monthly magazine Good Words printed her poem "Under the Trees". In all she published about 40 books for children, including novels, storybooks and picture books. She also published almost as many books jointly with others.

Nesbit's biographer, Julia Briggs, names her "the first modern writer for children", who "helped to reverse the great tradition of children's literature inaugurated by Lewis Carroll, George MacDonald and Kenneth Grahame, in turning away from their secondary worlds to the tough truths to be won from encounters with things-as-they-are, previously the province of adult novels". Briggs also credits Nesbit with inventing the children's adventure story. Noël Coward was an admirer. In a letter to an early biographer, Noel Streatfeild wrote, "She had an economy of phrase and an unparalleled talent for evoking hot summer days in the English countryside."

Among Nesbit's best-known books are The Story of the Treasure Seekers (1899) and The Wouldbegoods (1901), which tell of the Bastables, a middle-class family fallen on relatively hard times. The Railway Children is also popularised by a 1970 film version. Gore Vidal called the time-travel book, The Story of the Amulet, one where "Nesbit's powers of invention are at their best." Her children's writing also included plays and collections of verse.

Nesbit has been cited as the creator of modern children's fantasy. Her innovations placed realistic contemporary children in real-world settings with magical objects (which would now be classed as contemporary fantasy) and adventures and sometimes travel to fantastic worlds. This influenced directly or indirectly many later writers, including P. L. Travers (of Mary Poppins), Edward Eager, Diana Wynne Jones and J. K. Rowling. C. S. Lewis too paid heed to her in the Narnia series and mentions the Bastable children in The Magician's Nephew. Michael Moorcock later wrote a series of steampunk novels around an adult Oswald Bastable of The Treasure Seekers. In 2012, Jacqueline Wilson wrote a sequel to the Psammead trilogy: Four Children and It.

Nesbit also wrote for adults, including eleven novels, short stories, and four collections of horror stories.

In 2011, Nesbit was accused of plagiarising the plot of The Railway Children from The House by the Railway by Ada J. Graves. The Telegraph reported that the Graves book had appeared in 1896, nine years before The Railway Children, and listed similarities between them. However, not all sources agree on this finding: The magazine Tor.com posited an error in the earlier news reports, saying both books had been released in the same year, 1906.

In The New Yorker, Jessica Winter has noted that Nesbit's books are at times "blighted by racist and colonialist language and anti-Semitic tropes." Although she was the family breadwinner and has the father in The Railway Children declare that "Girls are just as clever as boys, and don’t you forget it!," she did not champion women's rights. "She opposed the cause of women’s suffrage—mainly, she claimed, because women could swing Tory, thus harming the Socialist cause." In 2022, nearly a century after her death, The Railway Children (HarperCollins Children’s Classics) and The House of Arden (New York Review Children’s Collection) were reissued. She is said to have avoided the literary moralizing that characterized the age. "And, most crucially, both books are constructed from a blueprint that is also a kind of reënactment of the author’s own childhood: an idyll torn up at its roots by the exigencies of illness, loss, and grief."

Legacy
Actress Judy Parfitt portrayed Nesbit in the 1972–1973 miniseries The Edwardians
Edith Nesbit Walk and cycle way, runs along the south side of Well Hall Pleasaunce in Eltham.
Lee Green, also in south-east London, has Edith Nesbit Gardens.
A 200-metre footpath in Grove Park south-east London, between Baring Road to Reigate Road, is named Railway Children Walk after the novel, as is one in Oxenhope, a film location on the Keighley and Worth Valley Railway used in the 1970 film.
There is a Nesbit Road in St Mary's Bay, Romney Marsh, where Nesbit's home Long Boat & Jolly Boat stands.

Nesbit's life led to a one-act, one-woman play, Larks and Magic, by Alison Neil.

The Edith Nesbit Society was founded in 1996 with Dame Jacqueline Wilson as president.

In The Guardian, Francis Spufford placed The Story of the Amulet first on his list of greatest children's books.

A. S. Byatt's novel The Children's Book is inspired partly by Nesbit, who appears as a character along with Kenneth Grahame and J. M. Barrie.

Biographies
Aside from her autobiographical Long Ago When I was Young 1966), Nesbit has spawned five biographies.
Doris Langley Moore E. Nesbit, 1933
Noel Streatfeild, Magic and the Magician: E. Nesbit and her Children’s Books, 1958
Julia Briggs, A Woman of Passion, 1987 
Elisabeth Galvin, The Extraordinary Life of E. Nesbit, 2018
Eleanor Fitzsimons, The Life and Loves of E Nesbit, 2019

Works

Novels for children

Bastable series
1899 The Story of the Treasure Seekers
1901 The Wouldbegoods
1904 New Treasure Seekers

The Complete History of the Bastable Family (1928) is a posthumous omnibus of the three Bastable novels, but not the complete history. Four more stories about it appear in the 1905 Oswald Bastable and Others. The Bastables also feature in the 1902 adult novel The Red House.

Psammead series
1902 Five Children and It
1904 The Phoenix and the Carpet
1906 The Story of the Amulet

House of Arden series
1908 The House of Arden
1909 Harding's Luck

Other children's novels

1906 The Railway Children
1907 The Enchanted Castle
1910 The Magic City
1911 The Wonderful Garden
1913 Wet Magic
1925 The novella Five of Us—and Madeline, published posthumously in a collection of that name

Novels for adults

As Fabian Bland:
The Prophet's Mantle. Serialised, Weekly Dispatch, 3 August–14 December 1884, published 1889
The Hour before Day. Serialised, Weekly Dispatch, 1885
Something Wrong. Serialised, Weekly Dispatch, 7 March to 4 July 1886
The Marden Mystery (1896) (rare: few if any copies survive)
As E Nesbit
1893 Her Marriage Lines. Serialised, Weekly Dispatch, 1893
1898 The Secret of Kyriels (rare: few copies survive)
1902 The Red House
1906 The Incomplete Amorist
1909 Salome and the Head (also known as The House with No Address)
1909 Daphne in Fitzroy Street
1911 Dormant (US title, Rose Royal)
1916 The Incredible Honeymoon
1922 The Lark

Stories and storybooks for children

1887 The Pixies Garden
1891 "The Pilot", poem, picture book(?), 
1892 Father Christmas: The Children's Casket of Pictures
1894 Miss Mischief
1895 Tick Tock, Tales of the Clock
1895 Pussy cat
1895 Doggy Tales
1896 The Prince, Two Mice and Some Kitchen-Maids. Father Christmas: The Children's Treasury of Pictures and Stories (1892)
1897 The Children's Shakespeare
1897 Royal Children of English History
1897 Tales Told in the Twilight (bedtime stories by several writers)
1898 The Book of Dogs
1899 Pussy and Doggy Tales
1901 The Book of Dragons (stories that appeared in The Strand, 1899)
1901 Nine Unlikely Tales
1902 The Revolt of the Toys
1903 The Rainbow Queen and Other Stories
1903 Playtime Stories
1904 The Story of Five Rebellious Dolls
1904 Cat Tales (by Nesbit and her daughter Rosamund E. Nesbit Bland)
1905 Oswald Bastable and Others (includes four Bastable stories)
1905 Pug Peter, King of Mouseland
1907 Beautiful Stories from Shakespeare (reprint of The Children's Shakespeare, 1895)
1908 The Old Nursery Stories
1912 The Magic World
1925 Five of Us—and Madeline (posthumously assembled and edited by Rosamund E. Nesbit Bland, containing the title novel and two short stories perhaps completed by Nesbit)

Short stories for adults
As Fabian Bland
"Psychical Research". Longman's Magazine, December 1884
"The Fabric of a Vision". Argosy, March 1885
"An Angel Unawares". Weekly Dispatch, 9 August 1885
"Desperate Conspirator". Weekly Dispatch, 15 May 1887
"A Pot of Money". Weekly Dispatch, 21 August 1887
"Christmas Roses". Weekly Dispatch, 25 December 1887
"High Social Position". Weekly Dispatch, 8 July 1888
"Mind and Money". Weekly Dispatch, 16 September 1888
"Getting into Society". Weekly Dispatch, 30 September 1888
"A Drama of Exile". Weekly Dispatch, 21 October 1888
"A Pious Fraud". Weekly Dispatch, 11 November 1888
"Her First Appearance". Weekly Dispatch, 16 December 1888
"Which Wins?" Murray's Magazine, December 1888
"Only a Joke". Longman's Magazine, August 1889
"The Golden Girl". Weekly Dispatch, 21 December 1890
As E Nesbit
"Uncle Abraham's Romance". Illustrated London News, 26 September 1891
"The Ebony Frame". Longman's Magazine, October 1891
"Hurst of Hurstcote", 1893
"The Butler in Bohemia" (by Nesbit and Oswald Barron), 1894
"A Strayed Sheep". Thetford & Watton Times and People's Weekly Journal, 2 June 1894 (with Oswald Barron)
"The Secret of Monsieur Roche Aymon". Atalanta Magazine, October 1894 (with Oswald Barron)
"The Letter in Brown Ink". Windsor Magazine, August 1899
"'Thirteen Ways Home", 1901
"The Literary Sense", 1903
"The Third Drug", Strand Magazine, February 1908, as by E. Bland. Reprinted in anthologies thus and as "The Three Drugs"
"These Little Ones", 1909
"The Aunt and the Editor". North Star and Farmers' Chronicle, 15 June 1909
"To the Adventurous", 1923

Short story collections for adults
Grim Tales (horror stories), 1893
"The Ebony Frame", "John Charrington's Wedding", "Uncle Abraham's Romance", "The Mystery of the Semi-Detached", "From the Dead", "Man-Size in Marble", "The Mass for the Dead"
Something Wrong (horror stories), 1893
In Homespun (10 stories "written in an English dialect" of South Kent and Sussex), 1896
Man and Maid (10 stories), 1906 (some supernatural stories)
Fear (horror stories), 1910
Collected Supernatural Stories, 2000
"Dormant" ("Rose Royal"), "Man-size in Marble", "The Detective", "No. 17", "John Charrington's Wedding", "The Blue Rose", "The Haunted House", "The House With No Address" ("Salome and the Head"), "The Haunted Inheritance", "The House of Silence", "The Letter in Brown Ink", "The Shadow", "The New Samson", "The Pavilion"
From the Dead: The Complete Weird Stories of E Nesbit, 2005
"Introduction" (by S. T. Joshi), "John Charrington's Wedding", "The Ebony Frame", "The Mass for the Dead", "From the Dead", "Uncle Abraham's Romance", "The Mystery of the Semi-Detached", "Man-Size in Marble", "Hurst of Hurstcote", "The Power of Darkness", "The Shadow", "The Head", "The Three Drugs", "In the Dark", "The New Samson", "Number 17", "The Five Senses", "The Violet Car", "The Haunted House", "The Pavilion", "From My School-Days","In the Dark", "The Mummies at Bordeaux"
The Power of Darkness: Tales of Terror''', 2006
"Man-Size in Marble", "Uncle Abraham's Romance", "From the Dead", "The Three Drugs", "The Violet Car", "John Charrington's Wedding", "The Pavilion", "Hurst of Hurstcote", "In the Dark", "The Head", "The Mystery of the Semi-detached", "The Ebony Frame", "The Five Senses", "The Shadow", "The Power of Darkness", "The Haunted Inheritance", "The Letter in Brown Ink", "The House of Silence", "The Haunted House", "The Detective"

Non-fiction
As Fabian Bland
No pieces yet traced
As E Nesbit
"Women and Socialism: from the Middle-Class Point of View". Justice, 4 and 11 April 1885
"Women and Socialism: A Working Woman's Point of View". Justice, 25 April 1885Wings and the Child, or The Building of Magic Cities, 1913Long Ago When I Was Young (originally a serial, 'My School-Days: Memories of Childhood', in Girl's Own Paper 1896–1897) Originally appearing as "My School-Days: Memories of Childhood" in The Girl's Own Paper between October 1896 and September 1897, Long Ago When I Was Young finally took book form in 1966, some 40 years after Nesbit's death, with an insightful introduction by Noel Streatfeild and some two dozen pen-and-ink drawings by Edward Ardizzone. The twelve chapters reproduce the instalments.

Poetry

"A Lovers' Petition". Good Words, 17 August 1881
"Absolution". Longman's Magazine, August 1882
"Possibilities". Argosy, July 1884
"Until the Dawn". Justice, 21 February 1885
"Socialist Spring Song". Today, June 1885
"The Dead to the Living". Gentleman's Magazine"Waiting". Justice, July 1885
"Two Voices". Justice, August 1885
"1857-1885". Justice, 22 August 1885
"The Wife of All Ages". Justice, 18 September 1885
"The Time of Roses", undated (c. 1890)
1886 "Lays and Legends"
1887 "The Lily and the Cross"
1887 "Justice for Ireland!". Warminster Gazette, 12 March 1887
1887 "The Ballad of Ferencz Renyi: Hungary, 1848". Longman's Magazine, April 1887
1887 "The Message of June". Longman's Magazine, June 1887
1887 "The Last Envoy"
1887 "The Star of Bethlehem"
1887 "Devotional Verses"
1888 "The Better Part, and Other Poems"
1888 "Landscape and Song"
1888 "The Message of the Dove"
1888 "All Round the Year"
1888 "Leaves of Life"
1889 "Corals and Sea Songs"
1890 "Songs of Two Seasons"
1892 "Sweet Lavender"
1892 "Lays and Legends", 2nd ed.
1895 "Rose Leaves"
1895 "A Pomander of Verse"
1898 "Songs of Love and Empire"
1901 "To Wish You Every Joy"
1905 "The Rainbow and the Rose"
1908 "Jesus in London"
1883–1908 "Ballads and Lyrics of Socialism"
1911 "Ballads and Verses of the Spiritual Life"
1912 "Garden Poems"
1915 "prayer in Time or War"
1922 "Many Voices"

Songs
1899 Slave Song (Chappell), 

Explanatory notes

References
Citations

Sources

 
 

External links

"The Writing of E. Nesbit" by Gore Vidal, The New York Review of Books, 3 December 1964
"Lost Lives: Edith Bland" by Bill Greenwell
Nesbit at YourDictionary.com (reprint from Encyclopedia of World Biography'')
 
Rosamund E. Nesbit Bland at LC Authorities, with 2 records, and at WorldCat

Online texts

Melisande by E. Nesbit , a tale similar to Rapunzel
My School Days (article series by Nesbit)
The Magic World

 

1858 births
1924 deaths
English children's writers
English fantasy writers
English socialists
English women novelists
English women poets
Members of the Fabian Society
People from Eltham
People from Kennington
People from Lewisham
People from New Romney
Victorian women writers
Deaths from lung cancer in England
Burials in Kent